Vasco da Gama is a neighborhood of Rio de Janeiro, Brazil. It is named after the Portuguese explorer Vasco da Gama. It was founded in 1998, which was the centenary year of professional football club Vasco da Gama's foundation.

References

Neighbourhoods in Rio de Janeiro (city)